Axenos or Axenus (ancient Greek: Ἄξενος or Ἄξεινος) may refer to:

Axenos, earlier name of the Achelous River, in Greece
Axenos, ancient name of the Black Sea
Axenus, a genus of moths of the family Noctuidae